Cacia cephalotes is a species of beetle in the family Cerambycidae. It was described by Maurice Pic in 1925. It is known from Bhutan,  India and Vietnam.

References

Cacia (beetle)
Beetles described in 1925